"Holiday" is an episode of the British comedy television series The Goodies.

This episode is also known as "Holidays" and as "The Holiday" and as "Holiday in Dunsquabbling".

This episode was made by LWT for ITV.

Written by The Goodies, with songs and music by Bill Oddie.

Plot
Tim is fed up with being ignored by the overworked and short-tempered Bill and Graeme, and suggests a three-week holiday for two in a ramshackle, poorly designed, leaky cottage called Dunsquabblin. After battling dismal weather, boredom, indoor birdwatching and failed attempts at relaxation, the team decide to stage 'a musical evening'.

Cultural references
 Bill impersonates Animal from The Muppet Show during his assault on the pots-and-pans drumkit.
 The episode ends with a parody of The Good Old Days, a long-running BBC variety series, which degenerates into an Oi! shoutalong, complete with a destructive finale reminiscent of The Who.

Notes
 Graeme makes references to Space Invaders, an early and extremely popular arcade game and plays with an oversized prop Rubik's Cube in one scene.
 On the DVD audio commentary, Bill Oddie notes that the card game played in this episode, 'Spat', bears some resemblance to Mornington Crescent from Brooke-Taylor and Garden's radio series I'm Sorry I Haven't A Clue.

DVD and VHS releases

This episode has been released on DVD.

References

 The Complete Goodies — Robert Ross, B T Batsford, London, 2000
 The Goodies Rule OK — Robert Ross, Carlton Books Ltd, Sydney, 2006
 From Fringe to Flying Circus — 'Celebrating a Unique Generation of Comedy 1960-1980' — Roger Wilmut, Eyre Methuen Ltd, 1980
 The Goodies Episode Summaries — Brett Allender
 The Goodies — Fact File — Matthew K. Sharp

External links
 
 ("Holiday" is listed under an alternative title at IMDb)

The Goodies (series 9) episodes
1982 British television episodes